Barbara Janet Baynton (née Lawrence; 4 June 1857 – 28 May 1929) was an Australian writer known primarily for her short stories about life in the bush. She published the collection Bush Studies (1902) and the novel Human Toll (1907), as well as writing for The Bulletin and The Sydney Morning Herald. She was a shrewd manager of her second husband's estate, owning properties in Melbourne and London. She acquired the title Lady Headley from her third marriage to Rowland Allanson-Winn, 5th Baron Headley, but never wrote under that name.

Early years 
Baynton was born in 1857 at Scone, New South Wales, the daughter of Irish bounty immigrants, John Lawrence and Elizabeth Ewart. However, she claimed to have been born in 1862 to Penelope Ewart and Captain Robert Kilpatrick, of the Bengal Light Cavalry.

Career
The fictional narrative of her birth gave her "entrée to polite circles as a governess" and, in 1880, she married Alexander Frater, the son of her employers. They soon moved to the Coonamble district, and had two sons and a daughter. However, Alexander Frater ran off with her niece, Sarah Glover, in 1887, and Barbara moved to Sydney and commenced divorce proceedings. A decree absolute was granted 4 March 1890.

On 5 March 1890, she married Dr Thomas Baynton, a retired surgeon aged 70 years who had literary friends. Beginning in December 1896, she began contributing short stories to the Bulletin. Six of these were published in 1902 in London by Gerald Duckworth and Company Ltd under the title of Bush Studies because Mrs Baynton had been unable to find a publisher for them in Sydney. Alfred Stephens, a close friend, reviewed the book in the Bulletin and stated: 'So precise, so complete, with such insight into detail and such force of statement, it ranks with the masterpieces of realism in any language. Percival Serle, however, found that The building up of detail, however, is at times overdone, and lacking humorous relief, the stories tend to give a distorted view of life in the back-blocks.

Baynton's husband died on 10 June 1904 and left his entire estate to her. She invested in the stock market, bought and sold antiques, and collected black opals from Lightning Ridge. She also became chairman of the Law Book Company of Australasia. In 1907, her only novel, Human Toll, was published, and in 1917 Cobbers, an edited reprint of Bush Studies with two additional stories, appeared. During World War I, she lived in England. Son Robert Frater had been on the staff of the Sydney Sun, and Alec Hay Frater was an artist; both enlisted with the British Army.

In February 1921, Baynton married her third husband Rowland Allanson-Winn, 5th Baron Headley; she was subsequently styled "Lady Headley". He was a convert to Islam, but she did not adopt his religion. In 1925, the couple separated and she returned to Melbourne where she lived in the suburb of Toorak. The split was reputedly due to her husband's refusal of the throne of Albania. Baynton died in Melbourne on 28 May 1929. She was survived by her third husband and her two sons and daughter by the first marriage. Her daughter Penny Frater married politician and journalist Henry Gullett; a grandson Jo Gullett also entered politics. The Australian actress Penne Hackforth-Jones (1942-2013), her great-granddaughter, wrote a biography of Baynton, titled  Barbara Baynton - Between Two Worlds (1989)

Selected works

Novel
 Human Toll (1907)

Collections
 Bush Studies (1902)
 Cobbers (1917)

Major individual works
 The Chosen Vessel (1896) - short story
 Fragments: 1 Day-Birth (1899) - poem
 A Dreamer (1902) - short story
 Billy Skywonkie (1902) - short story

Notes

References

Bibliography
'Baynton, Barbara Jane (1857 - 1929)', Australian Dictionary of Biography, Volume 7, MUP, 1979, pp 222–223.
Carter, Jennifer M. T. (2003) "'Getting to know you': Illusive writers" in National Library of Australia News, XIV(2): 11–14, November 2003
Miller, E. Morris & Frederick T. Macartney, Australian Literature, 1956, Angus and Robertson, Sydney, p. 55

Wilde, William H, Joy Hooton & Barry Andrews, (1986) The Oxford companion to Australian Literature, Melbourne, Oxford University Press, p. 79,

External links 

 Bayton Biography
 Barbara Baynton: Liar or Truth-teller
 AustLit Agent
 Lawson and Baynton: different perspectives
 Works by Barbara Baynton at Project Gutenberg Australia
 
 

1857 births
1929 deaths
Writers from New South Wales
Australian women novelists
Australian women poets
Australian women short story writers
Australian people of Irish descent
Headley
People from the Hunter Region
20th-century Australian novelists
20th-century Australian poets
19th-century Australian women writers
20th-century Australian women writers
19th-century Australian short story writers
20th-century Australian short story writers